Takuya Hara may refer to:

Takuya Hara (footballer) (born 1983), Japanese footballer
Takuya Hara (baseball) (born 1984), Japanese baseball player